The women's team competition of the squash event at the 2015 Southeast Asian Games was held from June 11–13, 2015 at the Kallang Squash Centre, Kallang, Singapore.  The Gold Medal was won by Malaysia.

Schedule

Results

Preliminary round

Pool A

Pool B

Knockout round

Semifinals

Gold medal match

References

External links

Women's team
2015 in women's squash
Squash tournaments in Singapore
Women's sports competitions in Singapore